is a city located in Chiba Prefecture, Japan. , the city had an estimated population of  173,740 in 78,483 households and a population density of 1700 people per km2.

Geography
Sakura is located in northeastern Chiba Prefecture on the Shimōsa Plateau. It is situated approximately 40 kilometers northeast of Tokyo and 15 kilometers from Narita International Airport. Chiba City, the prefectural capital, lies 15 kilometers southwest of Sakura. Lake Inba forms the northern city limits.

Neighboring municipalities
Chiba Prefecture
Hanamigawa-ku, Chiba
Wakaba-ku, Chiba
Yotsukaidō
Yachiyo
Inzai
Yachimata
Shisui

Climate
Sakura has a humid subtropical climate (Köppen Cfa) characterized by warm summers and cool winters with light to no snowfall.

Demographics
Per Japanese census data, the population of Sakura increased rapidly in the late 20th century and has plateaued in the 21st.

History
The area around Sakura has been inhabited since prehistory, and archaeologists have found numerous Kofun period burial tumuli in the area, along with the remains of a Hakuho period Buddhist temple. During the Kamakura and Muromachi periods, the area was controlled by the Chiba clan. During the Sengoku period, the Chiba clan fought the Satomi clan to the south, and the Later Hōjō clan to the west. After the defeat of the Chiba clan, the area came within the control of Tokugawa Ieyasu, who assigned one of his chief generals, Doi Toshikatsu to rebuild Chiba Castle and to rule over Sakura Domain as a daimyō. Doi rebuilt the area as a jōkamachi, or castle town, which became the largest castle town in the Bōsō region. Under the Tokugawa shogunate, Sakura Domain came to be ruled for most of the Edo period under the Hotta clan. In the Bakumatsu period the domain became a center for rangaku studies, centered on the Juntendō school of the doctor Taizen Satō (1804 – 1872). The Juntendō and other educational institutions in Sakura contributed greatly to the Meiji Restoration. After the abolition of Sakura Domain, the area eventually became part of Chiba Prefecture.

Sakura Town was one of several towns and villages created on April 1, 1889 under Inba District with the establishment of the modern municipalities system. On March 31, 1954, Sakura achieved city status through merger of the neighboring municipalities of Usui, Wada, Nego, Yadomi, and Shizu.

Government
Sakura has a mayor-council form of government with a directly elected mayor and a unicameral city council of 28 members. Sakura contributes three members to the Chiba Prefectural Assembly. In terms of national politics, the city is part of Chiba 9th district of the lower house of the Diet of Japan.

Economy
Sakura is a regional commercial center and, due to its numerous train connections, a bedroom community for nearby Chiba and Tokyo, with more than 24% of the population commuting, per the 2010 census.

Education
Keiai University branch campus
Chiba Keiai Junior College
Wayo Women's University branch campus
 Sakura has 23 public elementary schools and 11 public middle schools operated by the city government, and four public high schools operated by the Chiba Prefectural Board of Education.

Transportation

Railway
 JR East – Narita Line, Sōbu Main Line
  
 Keisei Electric Railway  -  Keisei Main Line
  -  -  -  - 
 Yamaman - Yamaman Yūkarigaoka Line
  -  -  - -  -

Highway

Local attractions

Sakura boasts a number of tourist attractions, including the large National Museum of Japanese History located on the ruins of Sakura Castle. Several samurai houses near the old castle are open to the public and are protected as Important Cultural Properties. Other sights of interest include the Moto Sakura Castle (one of the Continued Top 100 Japanese Castles.), Tsukamoto Sword Museum, Sakura Museum of History and Folklore, Sakura City Museum of Art, and the Sakura Juntendo Memorial Building. Nearby is also the Kawamura Memorial Museum of Art.

In 1994 on the 40th anniversary of the city's foundation a Dutch windmill called De Liefde was erected by the Dutch millwright company "Verbij Hoogmade BV" on the south-eastern shore of Lake Inba as a landmark of Sakura Furusato Square. The mill serving as a polder mill is named after the first Dutch sailing ship which landed on the Japanese shore in 1600. It is the only windmill of this type in Japan (a so-called "ground-sailer", which means a windmill whose sails reach almost down to the ground.

Noted people from Sakura
Hayashi Tadasu, Meiji period statesman
Tsuda Sen, Meiji period statesman
Nagashima Shigeo, Professional baseball player
BUMP OF CHICKEN, Japanese alternative rock group
Yoshimi Osawa, Japanese judoka and one of only three living Kodokan 10th dan
Ben-K, Japanese professional wrestler (Real Name: 
Daisuke Fukushima, Japanese Olympic show jumping rider
Shinnosuke Nakatani, Japanese footballer, playing as a defender for Nagoya Grampus in J1 League
Katsuya Nagato, Japanese footballer who plays as a defender for Kashima Antlers in the J1 League
Sakiko Odaka, Japanese women's professional shogi player ranked 1-kyū
Shinnosuke Shigenobu, Japanese professional baseball outfielder for the Yomiuri Giants in Japan's Nippon Professional Baseball
Asai Chū, Japanese painter, noted for his pioneering work in developing the yōga (Western-style) art movement in late 19th century and early twentieth-century Japanese painting

References

External links

Official Website 

 
Cities in Chiba Prefecture